Viciria is a genus of jumping spiders that was first described by Tamerlan Thorell in 1877.

Description
Both sexes reach a length of about 7 to 12 mm. Viciria is a colorful genus similar to Telamonia. However, the very long, thin opisthosoma of Viciria is almost cylindrical, and the color patterns differ. Viciria often shows a single broad longitudinal stripe with a pattern of black dashes on the opisthosoma. A white median stripe is present on the cephalus of the female.

Distribution
Like Telamonia, Viciria is found in Africa and Asia.

Species
 it contains twenty-one species:
 Viciria albolimbata Simon, 1885 — Sumatra
 Viciria arrogans Peckham & Peckham, 1907 — Borneo
 Viciria chrysophaea Simon, 1903 — Gabon
 Viciria concolor Peckham & Peckham, 1907 — Borneo
 Viciria detrita Strand, 1922 — Sumatra
 Viciria diademata Simon, 1902 — India
 Viciria epileuca Simon, 1903 — Gabon
 Viciria flavipes Peckham & Peckham, 1903 — South Africa
 Viciria flavolimbata Simon, 1910 — Guinea-Bissau
 Viciria lucida Peckham & Peckham, 1907 — Borneo
 Viciria minima Reimoser, 1934 — India
 Viciria miranda Peckham & Peckham, 1907 — Borneo
 Viciria moesta Peckham & Peckham, 1907 — Borneo
 Viciria pallens Thorell, 1877 — Sulawesi
 Viciria paludosa Peckham & Peckham, 1907 — Borneo
 Viciria pavesii Thorell, 1877 — Thailand, Malaysia, Singapore, Indonesia
 Viciria petulans Peckham & Peckham, 1907 — Borneo
 Viciria polysticta Simon, 1902 — Sri Lanka
 Viciria rhinoceros Hasselt, 1894 — Sulawesi
 Viciria scintillans Simon, 1910 — West Africa
 Viciria semicoccinea Simon, 1902 — Java

Transitions
Following species were transferred to other genera.
 Viciria alba - to Evarcha
 Viciria albocincta - to Vicirionessa
 Viciria alboguttata - to Epeus
 Viciria besanconi - to Vicirionessa
 Viciria bombycina - to Telamonia
 Viciria caprina - to Telamonia
 Viciria chabanaudi - to Vicirionessa
 Viciria diatreta - to Proszynskia
 Viciria dimidiata - to Telamonia
 Viciria elegans - to Telamonia
 Viciria equestris - to Vicirionessa
 Viciria flavobilineata - to Epeus
 Viciria flavocincta - to Evarcha
 Viciria formosa - to Telamonia
 Viciria fuscimana - to Vicirionessa
 Viciria hasselti - to Telamonia
 Viciria jeanneli - to Malloneta
 Viciria lawrencei - to Hyllus
 Viciria longiuscula - to Hyllus
 Viciria lupula - to Thyene
 Viciria mondoni - to Malloneta
 Viciria monodi - to Vicirionessa
 Viciria morigera - to Vicirionessa
 Viciria mustela - to Vicirionessa
 Viciria niveimana - to Vicirionessa
 Viciria ocellata - to Thyene
 Viciria parmata - to Vicirionessa
 Viciria peckhamorum - to Vicirionessa
 Viciria prenanti - to Vicirionessa
 Viciria signata - to Telamonia
 Viciria sponsa - to Telamonia
 Viciria tener - to Epeus
 Viciria terebrifera - to Telamonia
 Viciria tergina - to Vicirionessa
 Viciria thoracica - to Hyllus
 Viciria viciriaeformis - to Thyene

References

  (2000): An Introduction to the Spiders of South East Asia. Malaysian Nature Society, Kuala Lumpur.

External links

 Salticidae.org: Photograph of Viciria sp.
 Photograph of V. praemandibularis with eggs

Salticidae
Taxa named by Tamerlan Thorell
Salticidae genera
Spiders of Africa
Spiders of Asia